Maccaffertium exiguum is a species of flatheaded mayfly in the family Heptageniidae. It is found in North America.

References

Further reading

 

Mayflies
Articles created by Qbugbot
Insects described in 1933